The 60th New Brunswick Legislative Assembly consists of the members elected in the 2020 New Brunswick general election.

Seating Plan

Members

References 

Terms of the New Brunswick Legislature
2020 establishments in New Brunswick

2020 in New Brunswick
2020 in Canadian politics